The 2006 Hel van het Mergelland was the 33rd edition of the Volta Limburg Classic cycle race and was held on 1 April 2006. The race started and finished in Eijsden. The race was won by Mikhaylo Khalilov.

General classification

References

2006
2006 in road cycling
2006 in Dutch sport